The 2014 Ottawa Redblacks season was the first season for the team in the Canadian Football League. The Redblacks are the third CFL franchise to play in the city of Ottawa, and the first since the suspension of the Renegades in 2006. The Redblacks finished the season in 4th place in the East Division with a 2–16 record and were eliminated from playoff contention after a week 16 loss to the BC Lions.

Off-season

Acquisitions 
The Redblacks signed their first three players on November 28, 2013. Ottawa signed wide receiver Fred Rouse, defensive back/safety Nick Turnbull and defensive end DiMetrio Tyson. Leading up to the 2013 CFL Expansion Draft the Redblacks signed a number of players including; defensive back Jerrell Gavins, quarterback Matt Faulkner and running backs Jordan Roberts, Michael Hayes, and Eric O'Neal.

In February 2014, following the Expansion Draft, the Redblacks made a series of significant signings including the acquisition of former MOP quarterback Henry Burris, former defensive player of the year Jovon Johnson and LB Malik Jackson.

Expansion Draft 
The 2013 CFL Expansion Draft was a three-round CFL draft held on December 16, 2013, which assign players from existing CFL teams to the new Ottawa team. The structure of the draft was announced on January 19, 2011, which described one round for selecting import players and two rounds for selecting non-import players. Ottawa selected three players from each of the eight existing teams for a total of 24 players. Ottawa was allowed to select eight import players and 16 non-import players with quarterbacks, kickers and punters eligible within their respective import/non-import categories. Ottawa was able to select a maximum of two quarterbacks and one kicker/punter, but not select any two of these three players from the same team.

Overall, 24 players were selected in the draft, including two quarterbacks, three receivers, one running back, two fullbacks, six offensive linemen, six defensive linemen, three linebackers, and one defensive back. Only one pending free agent was selected, with Rory Kohlert's contract expiring February 15, 2014. The selections were announced live at cfl.ca on December 16, 2013.

2013 CFL draft
The 2013 CFL Draft took place on May 6, 2013. Despite not playing in the 2013 season, the Redblacks picked last in the first four rounds of the draft, with selections being limited to 18 NCAA redshirt juniors. These players were not eligible to sign for the 2013 season, but may sign with Ottawa for this season.

2014 CFL draft
The 2014 CFL Draft took place on May 13, 2014. The Redblacks began with the first pick in each of the seven rounds, but traded the first overall pick to Calgary for Jon Gott. They re-entered the first round after trading Kevin Glenn to the BC Lions and moved positions in the first and second round following a trade with the Montreal Alouettes. They also moved down in the third round after trading for Justin Phillips. The club also had two bonus picks at the end of the draft, which brought their total to nine.

Training camp 
On March 11, 2014, the Redblacks announced that they would hold a mini-training camp April 9–10, 2014 at Bon Secours Washington Redskins Training Center in Richmond, Virginia. At this camp, the entire team roster would participate in drills and work out under the supervision of head coach Rick Campbell and the Redblacks football operations staff.

Schedule 
On February 10, 2014, it was announced that the Ottawa Redblacks would play their "home" pre-season game at Mosaic Stadium at Taylor Field against the Roughriders on June 14, 2014. Ottawa was the home side of the field and the team was introduced as the home team. It was further announced that the Redblacks would have a bye for the first week of the regular season and then play away games at Edmonton and Winnipeg before their home opener in Week 4 on July 18 against the Toronto Argonauts. These arrangements were made to accommodate for any delays that might be incurred due to the construction of TD Place Stadium.

This was the Redblacks' inaugural season in the Canadian Football League.

Preseason

 Games played with white uniforms.

Regular season

Standings

Schedule

 Games played with colour uniforms.
 Games played with white uniforms.
 Games played with alternate uniforms.

Team

Roster

Coaching staff

Notes

References

2014 Canadian Football League season by team
Ottawa Redblacks seasons
Ottawa Redblacks